A Letter Home is the 33rd studio album by Canadian / American musician Neil Young. It was released on April 19, 2014 on Record Store Day by Third Man Records. The entire album, which consists of covers of classic songs by artists Bruce Springsteen, Bob Dylan, Willie Nelson, Gordon Lightfoot and others, was recorded in a refurbished 1947 Voice-o-Graph vinyl recording booth at Jack White's Third Man Records recording studio in Nashville, Tennessee. Of this method, White said, "we were obfuscating beauty on purpose to get to a different place, a different mood." The opening spoken-word track, and other spoken lines throughout the album, were addressed to Edna "Rassy" Young, Neil's mother who died in 1990. A message on Young's website described the album as "an unheard collection of rediscovered songs from the past recorded on ancient electro-mechanical technology captures and unleashes the essence of something that could have been gone forever".

Reception

The A.V. Club considers A Letter Home one of the best albums of the first half of 2014, calling it the "most surprising record by a guy who's built his career on surprising you".

Track listing

Bonus tracks from box set singles:

Personnel
Neil Young - vocals, guitar, harmonica, piano
Jack White - vocals, piano on "On the Road Again"; vocals, guitar on "I Wonder If I Care as Much"

Box set
The box set includes:

 1 standard 12" LP pressed on 180-gram black vinyl
 1 "direct feed from the booth" audiophile 12" LP pressed on 180-gram black vinyl
 Seven 6" vinyl 33 RPM discs pressed on clear vinyl
 1 standard CD
 1 standard DVD with footage from the recording
 1 32-page,  12" x 12" book
 Download card to redeem the digital album of the "direct feed from the booth" audiophile version

The 7th 6" disc of this set features a version of Dylan's "Blowin' In The Wind" backed with an alternate take/arrangement of "Crazy"

Audio production
Reproduced by: Jack White & Neil Young
Recorded at: Third Man Records, Nashville, TN
Electro-mechanically engineered by: Joshua V. Smith & Kevin Carrico 
Recorded by: Joshua V. Smith 
Assisted by: Mindy Watts
Recorded to acetate by: George Ingram
Mastered by: Bob Ludwig for Gateway Mastering Studios, Portland, ME

DVD production
Directed by: Bernard Shakey
Produced by: Will Mitchell
Executive Producer: Elliot Rabinowitz
Post Production for Shakey Pictures at Upstream Multimedia
Edited by: Benjamin Johnson 
Assistant Editor: Hannah Choe
Motion Graphics: Kris Kunz, Atticus Culver-Rease
DVD Menu Art Direction: Toshi Onuki
DVD Menu Sound Design: Will Mitchell
Hand lettering “A Letter Home”: Julian Baker
DVD Authoring: DVS Intelestream
Clearances: Marcy Gensic

Documentary Film Crew
Director of Photography: Benjamin Johnson
Sound: Will Mitchell

Artwork
Art Direction & Design: Gary Burden & Jenice Heo for R. Twerk & Co
Photo Credits: Front Cover-Will Mitchell, Back Cover- Jo McCaughey

Charts

Weekly charts

Year-end charts

Personnel
Neil Young – vocals, guitar, harmonica, piano
Jack White – vocals and guitar on "On the Road Again", vocals and piano on "I Wonder If I Care as Much"

References

2014 albums
Neil Young albums
Third Man Records albums
Record Store Day releases
Covers albums
Albums produced by Neil Young
Albums produced by Jack White
Lo-fi music albums